Ten ships of the Royal Navy have been called HMS Aurora or HMS Aurore, after the Roman Goddess of the dawn.

 HMS Aurora (1757)  was a 36-gun fifth rate, formerly the French Abenakise. She was captured in 1757 and broken up in 1763.
  was a 32-gun fifth rate launched in 1766, sailed September 1769 for East Indies, lost without a trace, presumably from fire or storm, in the Indian Ocean in January 1770.
  was a 28-gun sixth rate launched in 1777 and sold in 1814.
 HMS Aurore (1793) was a French Navy 32-gun frigate handed over to the British at the capture of Toulon in 1793. She became a prison ship in 1799, and was broken up in 1803. 
She was captured in 1814 and broken up in 1851.
  was a wooden screw frigate launched in 1861 and broken up in 1881.
  was an  armoured cruiser launched in 1887 and sold in 1907.
  was an  light cruiser launched in 1913.  She was briefly transferred to the Royal Canadian Navy in 1920 and was broken up in 1927.
  was an  light cruiser launched in 1936. She was sold to The Republic of China in 1948, was sunk in 1950 and salvaged in 1951, hulked and then scrapped by 1960.
  was a  launched in 1962 and broken up in 1990.

Battle honours
Ships named Aurora have earned the following battle honours:

St. Lucia 1778
Minorca 1798
Guadeloupe 1810
China 1900
Dogger Bank 1915
Bismarck 1941
Mediterranean 1941–43
Malta Convoys 1941
North Africa 1942–43
Sicily 1943
Salerno 1943
Aegean 1943–44
South France 1944

See also
 , launched in 1809 for the British East India Company's naval arm, the Bombay Marine; last listed 1828

Royal Navy ship names